Michel Mondeguer (born 24 November 1988) is a Democratic Republic of the Congo former professional footballer who played as a striker.

Career
Mondeguer was born in Kinshasa. The French citizen played on the professional level in Ligue 2 for Troyes AC, he played his debut on 24 September 2008 against FC Metz in the Coupe de la Ligue. He left his club ES Troyes on 20 August 2009 to sign for Quimper Kerfeunteun F.C., but three months later agreed the termination of his contract. On 2 February 2010, he signed with Championnat de France amateur club SR Colmar. He left in summer 2010 signing for USM Alger.

References

1988 births
Living people
Democratic Republic of the Congo footballers
Footballers from Kinshasa
Association football forwards
Ligue 2 players
ES Troyes AC players
Quimper Kerfeunteun F.C. players
FC Nantes players
SR Colmar players
USM Alger players
ES Thaon players
FC Montceau Bourgogne players
SO Cholet players
Olympique Saint-Quentin players
CMS Oissel players
Democratic Republic of the Congo expatriate footballers
Democratic Republic of the Congo expatriate sportspeople in France
Expatriate footballers in France